The deer forest (Gaelic: frìth) is a sporting estate which is kept and managed largely or solely for the purposes of maintaining a resident population of red deer for sporting (deer stalking) purposes. It is an institution and phenomenon peculiar to the Highlands of Scotland.

Typically, deer forests are in hilly and mountainous areas of the Highlands and Islands; and, despite the use of the term "forest" they are almost all devoid of trees - the word is used here in its original sense, meaning an area set aside for hunting, rather than its later association with trees (see Royal Forest). The land is typically not suitable for crops. Most deer forests have large areas covered with heath, in many places peat bogs, marshes, lochs or bare rock, elsewhere patches of grass or other herbage, while plantations of trees of greater or less extent may also occur.

Most deer forests are not fenced or enclosed in any way, and the deer can move freely across large tracts of hill country.  Boundaries, referred to as marches, are usually marked by a river, stream, ridge, shoreline or similar natural feature.  Hind forests and stag forests are so called because of the tendencies of red deer to form large, single-sex herds outside the autumn rutting time, and most forests hold either a resident stag herd or a hind herd for much of the year.

In deer forest, the term forest is derived from the ancient and medieval use of the Latin word foris - "open" or "waste", to denote an extensive outdoor "waste area" kept as a hunting preserve.

Scotland's deer forests are almost all privately owned and managed, although a few once-distinguished forests such as Torridon and Glenfeshie have moved into semi-public ownership via bodies such as the National Trust for Scotland, the Royal Society for the Protection of Birds and the Ministry of Defence, and sporting deer stalking is no longer carried on there.

Some deer forests are retained in the hands of their proprietors, while many others are rented out, either for the shooting season or for a period of years, and in this case may bring a large rental to their owners. A person who rents the ground pays a fee for every stag killed. A deer forest is always an expensive affair, not only for the rent that has to be paid, but also for the number of keepers, guides, watchers, beaters, etc., that have to be employed in connection with it.

A comprehensive account of nearly all the deer forests in their late Victorian heyday is provided by Grimble (1896)

List of deer forests

Notes

References
Deer Stalking Scotland

Deer hunting
Rural Scotland
Hunting and shooting in Scotland
Highlands and Islands of Scotland
Deer in Scotland